The Township of Madawaska Valley is a township municipality in Renfrew County, Ontario, Canada. It was formed in 2001 through the amalgamation of the village of Barry's Bay and the townships of Radcliffe and Sherwood Jones & Burns. It includes the settlements of  Combermere and Wilno.

Demographics 

Population trend:
 Population in 2016: 4,123
 Population in 2011: 4,282
 Population in 2006: 4,381
 Population in 2001: 4,406
 Population total in 1996: 4,342
 Barry's Bay: 1,086
 Radcliffe township: 1,116
 Sherwood, Jones and Burns township: 2,140
 Population in 1991:
 Barry's Bay: 1,088
 Radcliffe township: 1,077
 Sherwood, Jones and Burns township: 2,101

Mother tongue:
 English as first language: 82.1%
 French as first language: 1.1%
 English and French as first language: 0%
 Other as first language: 16.8%

References

External links

Lower-tier municipalities in Ontario
Municipalities in Renfrew County
Township municipalities in Ontario